The First Congress of the Republic of Texas, consisting of the Senate of the Republic of Texas and House of Representatives of the Republic of Texas, met in Columbia at two separate buildings (one for each chamber) and then in Houston at the present-day site of The Rice from October 3, 1836, to June 13, 1837, during the first year of Sam Houston's presidency.

All members of Congress were officially non-partisan. According to the Constitution of the Republic of Texas of 1836, each member of the House of Representatives was elected for a term of one year.  Each county was guaranteed at least one representative.

Each Senator was elected for a three-year term to represent a district that each had a nearly equal portion of the nation's population.  Each district could have no more than one Senator.

Members

Senate
 José Francisco Ruiz – District of Bexar
 James Collinsworth – District of Brazoria (1st session)
 William Green Hill – District of Brazoria (2nd session)
 Alexander Somervell – District of Colorado and Austin counties
 Edwin Morehouse – District of Goliad, Refugio, and San Patricio
 Robert Wilson –District of Harrisburg and Liberty
 Stephen H. Everitt – District of Jasper and Jefferson
 Albert Clinton Horton – District of Matagorda, Victoria, and Jackson 
 Sterling C. Robertson – District of Milam
 James S. Lester – District of Mina and Gonzales
 Robert Anderson Irion – District of Nacogdoches
 Richard Ellis – District of Red River
 Shelby Corzine – District of San Augustine (1st session)
 Henry William Augustine – District of San Augustine (2nd session)
 Willis H. Landrum – District of Shelby and Sabine
 Jesse Grimes – District of Washington

House of Representatives

Austin County
 Moseley Baker

Bexar County
 Thomas Green

Brazoria County
 Branch T. Archer, from October 4, 1836
 John A. Wharton, from October 4, 1836

Colorado County
 J. G. Robertson

Goliad County
 John M. Chenoweth

Gonzales County
 William S. Fisher

Harrisburg County
 John W. Moore, until October 11, 1836
 Jesse H. Cartwright, from October 11, 1836

Jackson County
 Samuel A. White

Jasper County
 Col. Samuel S. Lewis

Jefferson County
 Claiborne West

Liberty County
 Edward Thomas Branch

Mina County
 John Wheeler Bunton
 Jesse Billingsley

Matagorda County
 Ira Ingram, 1st session*
 Daniel Davis D. Baker, 2nd session

Milam County
 Francis Marcus Weatherred, Jr., until October 31, 1836
 Samuel Tabor Allen, from October 31, 1836

Nacogdoches County
 John Kirby Allen
 Haden Edwards, 1st session
 Hayden S. Arnold, 2nd session

Refugio County
 Elkanah Brush

Red River County
 Mansell Walter Matthews 
 George Washington Wright
 William Becknell, until October 13, 1836
 Collin McKinney, from October 13, 1836

Sabine County
 John Boyd

San Augustine County
 William W. Holman
 Joseph Rowe

San Patricio County
 John Turner, until October 20, 1836
 John Geraghty, from October 20, 1836

Shelby County
 Richard Hooper
 Sydney Oswald Penington

Victoria County
 Richard Roman

Washington County
 William Warner Hill
 W. W. Gant, from October 21, 1836

Standing committees

Senate
 Ways and Means
 Judiciary
 Post Office and Post Roads
 State of the Republic
 Military Affairs
 Roads, Bridges, and Ferries
 Claims and Accounts
 Public Lands
 Indian Affairs
 County Boundaries
 Naval Affairs

House of Representatives
 Ways and Means
 Judiciary
 Post Office
 State of the Republic
 Military Affairs
 Roads, Bridges, and Ferries
 Claims and Accounts
 Public Lands
 Indian and Indian Affairs
 County Boundaries
 Naval Affairs
 Foreign Relations

Employees

Senate
 Sergeant at Arms – William King (1st session), Noah T. Byars (2nd session)
 Clerk – Richardson A. Scurry (1st session), Arthur Robertson (2nd session)
 Doorkeeper – Joshua Canter (1st session), Marshall Mann (2nd session)

House of Representatives
 Sergeant at Arms – A. L. Harrison (1st session), George S. Stratton (2nd session)
 Clerk – Willis A. Farris (1st session), William Fairfax Gray (2nd session)
 Doorkeeper – W. T. Hendricks (1st session), Abner S. McDonald (2nd session), S. L. Johnson (2nd session)

References

 Senate Journal: 1st Congress Regular Session. G. & T. H. Borden, Public Printers. 1836.
 Senate Journal: 1st Congress Second Session. Telegraph Power Press. 1838.
 House Journal: 1st Congress Regular Session. Telegraph Power Press. 1838.
 House Journal:1st Congress Second Session. Telegraph Power Press. 1838.

 
1836 in the Republic of Texas
1837 in the Republic of Texas
Congress of the Republic of Texas